Teresa Załuska (1676-1759), was a Polish noblewoman and orator. She is foremost known for her political activity and her talent as orator. She supported Stanisław Leszczyński during the War of the Polish Succession. She is famous for the speech she gave to the Crown Tribunal in defense against the confiscation of her property, which was printed and published.

References

 Klemens Kantecki,"Pani starościna rawska", [w:] Dla Zagrzebia. Album Koła Literackiego we Lwowie , Lwów, 1881 , str. 67–71 [6]

18th-century Polish–Lithuanian politicians
18th-century Polish women
1759 deaths
1676 births
People of the War of the Polish Succession
18th-century Polish nobility